Hedley Webster (21 July 1880 – 28 June 1954) was the 12th Bishop of Killaloe, Kilfenora, Clonfert and Kilmacduagh.

Educated at Trinity College, Dublin and  ordained in 1904, his first posts were curacies at St Luke’s, Cork and  Holy Trinity, Cork. He held incumbencies at Kinneigh  and Blackrock before being appointed Archdeacon of Cork in 1938. He was Bishop of Killaloe, Kilfenora, Clonfert and Kilmacduagh from 1945 to 1953.

References

1880 births
Alumni of Trinity College Dublin
Archdeacons of Cork
20th-century Anglican bishops in Ireland
Bishops of Killaloe and Clonfert
1954 deaths